The Roque tree frog (Hyloscirtus phyllognathus) is a species of frog in the family Hylidae found in Colombia, Ecuador, and Peru. Its natural habitats are subtropical or tropical moist lowland forests, subtropical or tropical moist montane forests, and rivers. It is threatened by habitat loss.

References

Hyloscirtus
Amphibians of Colombia
Amphibians of Ecuador
Amphibians of Peru
Amphibians described in 1941
Taxonomy articles created by Polbot